"Nothing Ever Hurt Me (Half as Bad as Losing You)" is a novelty song written by Bobby Braddock and recorded by American country singer George Jones.  The song was recorded at a blistering speed and contains tongue twisting lyrics about a country boy for whom nothing ever goes right.  The song would reach #7 on the charts. In the liner notes to the 1982 Jones compilation Anniversary – 10 Years of Hits, producer Billy Sherrill writes that Jones rarely performed the song live because he could never remember all the words.  Jones would record several more Braddock compositions, including "He Stopped Loving Her Today."

Discography

1973 songs
Songs written by Bobby Braddock
Song recordings produced by Billy Sherrill